The Northern Valley Regional High School District is a comprehensive regional public high school district composed of two public high schools serving students in ninth through twelfth grades from Closter, Demarest, Harrington Park, Haworth, Northvale, Norwood and Old Tappan, suburban communities in Bergen County, New Jersey, United States. Students from Rockleigh attend the district as part of a sending/receiving relationship.

As of the 2020–21 school year, the district, comprised of three schools, had an enrollment of 2,101 students and 234.8 classroom teachers (on an FTE basis), for a student–teacher ratio of 8.9:1.

The district is classified by the New Jersey Department of Education as being in District Factor Group "I", the second-highest of eight groupings. District Factor Groups organize districts statewide to allow comparison by common socioeconomic characteristics of the local districts. From lowest socioeconomic status to highest, the categories are A, B, CD, DE, FG, GH, I and J.

The communities in the district, made up of upper-middle income families, consistently support the school budget, which provides for varied, in-depth college preparatory and career-oriented curricula.  Courses range from the remedial to Advanced Placement.

The district participates in special education programs offered by Region III, one of seven such regional programs in Bergen County. Region III coordinates and develops special education programs for the 1,000 students with learning disabilities in the region, which includes the Northern Valley District, as well as those for the Alpine, Closter, Demarest, Harrington Park, Haworth, Northvale, Norwood and  Old Tappan districts.

History
The district's first high school facility opened in Demarest in September 1955, before which students from the constituent municipalities attended Closter High School, Dumont High School or Tenafly High School.

After voters rejected a June 1959 referendum that would have raised $3.25 million for construction of the district's second high school in Old Tappan, voters narrowly approved a trimmed-down version of the plan in January 1960 that reduced the cost to $2.9 million (equivalent to $ million in ).

The Old Tappan school was opened with 740 students in grades 9-11 in March 1962 to address overcrowding in the district's original school at Demarest that had been holding split sessions before the new school opened. At its establishment, Northern Valley Old Tappan served students from Harrington Park, Northvale, Norwood and Old Tappan, as well as those from the northern portion of Closter.

Awards, recognition and rankings
The district's high schools at Demarest and Old Tappan were respectively the 42nd and 55th-ranked public high schools in New Jersey out of 339 schools statewide in New Jersey Monthly magazine's September 2014 cover story on the state's "Top Public High Schools.

Extracurricular activities 
The school faculty support and encourage student participation in the variety of sports, social and academic club activities.  In each school, there are over 23 sports, which include participation at the freshman, junior varsity, and varsity level (46 teams) in the North Bergen Interscholastic Athletic League, as well as 60 co-curricular activities.

Radio station
The Northern Valley Regional High School district has its own internet radio station, WNVW. The radio station can be accessed through the school's main website,  and plays a variety of music in addition to sports, news, and occasional school announcements.

Schools 
Schools in the district (with 2020–21 enrollment data from the National Center for Education Statistics) are:
Northern Valley Regional High School at Demarest served 955 students from Closter, Demarest, and Haworth.
Dr. Timothy Gouraige, Principal
Northern Valley Regional High School at Old Tappan served 1,103 students from Harrington Park, Northvale, Norwood, Old Tappan, and Rockleigh.
Dr. Bruce R. Sabatini, Principal
Northern Valley Central served 199 students in PreK to 18 years of age. The school, located in Norwood, provides a permanent home for special needs programs offered through the district.

Both of the high schools in the district are accredited by the Middle States Association of Colleges and Schools and by the New Jersey Department of Education.

Administration 
Core members of the district's administration are:
James Santana, Superintendent
Marc Capizzi, Business Administrator / Board Secretary

Board of education
The district's board of education, comprised of nine members, sets policy and oversees the fiscal and educational operation of the district through its administration. As a Type II school district, the board's trustees are elected directly by voters to serve three-year terms of office on a staggered basis, with three seats up for election each year held (since 2012) as part of the November general election. The board appoints a superintendent to oversee the district's day-to-day operations and a business administrator to supervise the business functions of the district. Seats on the board of education are allocated based on the population of the constituent municipalities, with two seats each allocated to Closter and Old Tappan, and the other five municipalities each assigned one seat.

References

External links 
Northern Valley Regional High School District

School Data for the Northern Valley Regional High School District, National Center for Education Statistics

Closter, New Jersey
Demarest, New Jersey
Harrington Park, New Jersey
Haworth, New Jersey
Northvale, New Jersey
Norwood, New Jersey
Old Tappan, New Jersey
Rockleigh, New Jersey
New Jersey District Factor Group I
School districts in Bergen County, New Jersey